Kpati is an extinct Grassfields language formerly spoken in the Wukari and Takum LGAs of Taraba State, Nigeria. It was first reported as extinct by Grimes, Barbara (1984). Kpati was classified as a Ngemba language by Fivas – Scott (1977).

References

Languages of Nigeria
Extinct languages of Africa
Ngemba languages